Ohta No.3 Dam  is a rockfill dam located in Hyogo Prefecture in Japan. The dam is used for power production. The catchment area of the dam is 1.6 km2. The dam impounds about 64  ha of land when full and can store 9313 thousand cubic meters of water. The construction of the dam was started on 1980 and completed in 1995.

See also
List of dams in Japan

References

Dams in Hyogo Prefecture